Rear Admiral Roberto Camerini (born 23 July 1955, in Sliema) is an Italian Navy officer, currently serving as Commander Maritime Command North.

He joined the Navy in 1974 and attended the Naval Academy before joining the submarine branch. He commanded the submarine Romeo Romei from 1985 to 1986  and Giuliano Prini from 1984-1990 as well as the 2nd Submarine Group.

From 2013 to 2015 he served as Commander Maritime Command Sicily before being appointed Commander Maritime Command North in February 2015.

References

Italian admirals
Living people
1955 births